Alaküla may refer to:

Places
Alaküla, Lääne County, village in Lihula Parish, Lääne County, Estonia
Alaküla, Rapla County, village in Märjamaa Parish, Rapla County, Estonia
Alaküla, Tartu County, village in Haaslava Parish, Tartu County, Estonia
Alaküla (Mõniste), settlement? in Mõmiste Parish, Võru County, Estonia

People with the surname
Allan Alaküla (born 1968), Estonian journalist
Ellen Alaküla (1927– 2011), Estonian actress

See also
Altküla (disambiguation)

Estonian-language surnames